Sahara Hotnights are a Swedish rock band from Robertsfors, Sweden. Their style incorporates elements of garage rock, power pop and punk.

History
The band formed sometime around 1991/1992, "due to boredom". While in Australia, Josephine Forsman bet on a horse named Sahara Hotnights and used the name for the band. Around 1995, they won a "battle of the bands" contest and were awarded with a chance to record their songs in studio. Their debut EP, Suits Anyone Fine, was released in 1997 to immediate success and critical acclaim in Europe. Soon afterwards, the band signed with the Swedish label Speech Records, and over the next two years released three further singles, "Face Wet", "Oh Darling!", and "Nothing Yet".  In 1999, Sahara Hotnights released their debut studio album C'mon Let's Pretend, which earned two Grammis nominations.

The Drive Dead Slow EP appeared in April 2000, released on the BMG label, before the band's second album Jennie Bomb (named for Jennie Asplund) was released in 2001 (2002 in America). The timing of its release coincided with a surge in interest in Swedish rock'n'roll bands, such as The Hives, The (International) Noise Conspiracy, Mando Diao and Hellacopters. The songs "On Top Of Your World" and "With Or Without Control" were released as singles. "Alright Alright (Here's My Fist Where's The Fight?)" is featured in Cheaper by the Dozen, Stormbreaker, New York Minute and on the Jackass: The Movie soundtrack.

Sahara Hotnights opened for The Hives before releasing Kiss & Tell in 2004 on the RCA label. The tour sprouted from a relationship between Maria Andersson and Hives' frontman Howlin' Pelle Almqvist. "Hot Night Crash" and "Who Do You Dance For?" are singles taken from the album. "Hot Night Crash" also appears on the soundtrack of Burnout 3: Takedown and of Tony Hawk's Downhill Jam. The song "No Big Deal" is played in CKY4.

A new single entitled "Cheek to Cheek" culled from their fourth studio album What If Leaving Is A Loving Thing on Stand By Your Band Records was released via the band's MySpace site. The album was released on 18 April 2007. Commenting on the lyrics on the album, songwriter Maria Andersson said: "if you read them you'll understand. The good thing with being able to write lyrics is that you can sit here and shut up about it."

Sahara Hotnights' sound has been described as a mix between Blondie, The Ramones, and Nirvana. Although their latest work has a more pop sound to it, Sahara Hotnights have always been influenced by classic rock and punk bands. When the Kiss & Tell album was released, many accustomed to the unforgiving stance of Jennie Bomb balked at their attempt to make an album that was dance crafty. However, Maria Andersson, described the Jennie Bomb album as having a "slick sound to the rock songs, while Kiss and Tell has a raw sound to the pop songs."

The band's fifth album, Sparks, a covers collection restyled by the band, was released in 2009. In 2011, the band released its sixth album, eponymously titled Sahara Hotnights.

The band later went on a long hiatus in 2011. During early 2019, band members put out pictures from the studio. A new single Reverie was released on 18 February 2022 and their seventh album Love In A Time Of Low Expectations was released on 6 May 2022.

Members
Maria Andersson (born 4 December 1981, Umeå, Sweden) – Lead vocals, rhythm guitar
Jennie Asplund (born 24 November 1979, Robertsfors, Sweden) – Backing vocals, lead guitar
Johanna Asplund (born 21 September 1981, Umeå, Sweden) – Backing vocals, bass
Josephine Forsman (born 20 May 1981, Umeå, Sweden) – Drums

Discography
AlbumsC'mon Let's Pretend – 1999 (No. 15)Jennie Bomb – 2001 Continental Europe / 2002 UK/USA (No. 2)Kiss & Tell – 2004 (No. 4)What If Leaving Is a Loving Thing - 2007 (No. 5)Sparks - 2009 (No. 2)Sahara Hotnights - 2011 (No. 6)Love in Times of Low Expectations - 2022 (No. 11 Sweden)

EPsSuits Anyone Fine – 1997Drive Dead Slow'' – 2000

Singles

References

External links

 Sahara Hotnights Interview
Pre gig interview with Josephine and Jennie

Swedish rock music groups
All-female bands
Riot grrrl bands
Swedish indie rock groups
Musical groups established in 1992
English-language singers from Sweden